The BL 6-inch Mark XI naval gun was a British 50 calibres high-velocity naval gun which was mounted as primary armament on cruisers and secondary armament on pre-dreadnought battleships from 1906 onwards.

History 
The gun with its increased length of 50 calibres gave improved firepower over the current 6-inch Mk VII gun of 45 calibres. However, its increased length and weight made it unwieldy in the current manually operated shipboard mountings on light cruisers, which did not provide a steady platform. Britain reverted to 45-calibres guns in new warships from 1914 onwards with the BL 6-inch Mk XII gun.  Of the 177 produced 126 remained for Royal Navy use in 1939.

Naval gun 
Guns were mounted in the following ships :
 The last 3 King Edward VII class battleships Britannia, Africa and Hibernia laid down 1902–1904
 Armoured cruisers: HMS Duke of Edinburgh and Black Prince laid down 1903
 Bristol class light cruisers laid down 1909
 Weymouth class cruisers laid down 1910
 Chatham class light cruisers laid down 1911
 Birmingham class light cruisers laid down 1912
 Monitor HMS Marshal Ney as re-gunned in 1918

Coast defence gun 

The Mk XI gun was emplaced for coast defence in South Africa and particularly in Australia leading up to World War II, and remained in service until the 1950s. Guns in Australia came from the decommissioned World War I cruisers HMAS Sydney, HMAS Melbourne and HMAS Brisbane and were emplaced in northern Australia and Torres Strait to defend against possible attack by Japan, and on Rottnest Island WA, Brisbane and the Sydney harbour and Port Kembla defences.

See also 
 List of naval guns

Weapons of comparable role, performance and era 
 15 cm/50 41st Year Type : Imperial Japanese Navy equivalent gun
 6"/50 caliber gun : US equivalent

Surviving examples 

 RGF gun No. 2035 of 1905, and 1 other gun at Malgaskop, Saldanha Bay, South Africa
 VSM gun No. 2305 of 1912 formerly at Port Wakefield Proof Range, north of Adelaide, and since 2006 at B42 gun emplacement at Lower Georges Heights, Sydney Australia
 A coast defence gun at East Point Military museum, Darwin, Australia
 One of the HMAS Sydney guns at Leighton Battery, Fremantle, Western Australia
 One of HMAS Melbourne's guns at the Fleet Air Arm Museum, Nowra, NSW, Australia

References

Sources
 David Spethman, "The Garrison Guns of Australia 1788 – 1962", published by Ron H Mortensen, Inala QLD 2008.

External links 

 Tony DiGiulian, British 6"/50 (15.2 cm) BL Marks XI and XI*

Naval guns of the United Kingdom
World War I naval weapons of the United Kingdom
152 mm artillery
Coastal artillery